Herbert Leupold (20 June 1908 – 22 December 1942) was a German cross country skier and biathlete who competed in the 1930s.

Leupold was born in Wüstewaltersdorf. He was killed during World War II in Navaginskaya, Krasnodar Krai.

Leupold won a silver medal in the 4 x 10 km at the 1934 FIS Nordic World Ski Championships in Sollefteå.

At the 1936 Winter Olympics, in the rank of a Leutnant, he was a member of the German relay team which finished sixth in the 4x10 km relay competition. He also participated in the demonstration event, military patrol (precursor to biathlon). His German team finished fifth in the military patrol event. Furthermore Leupold was German 50 km cross-country skiing champion in 1936, 1937 and 1939.

References

External links

World Championship results 

1908 births
1942 deaths
People from Wałbrzych County
People from the Province of Silesia
German military patrol (sport) runners
German male cross-country skiers
Olympic biathletes of Germany
Olympic cross-country skiers of Germany
Cross-country skiers at the 1936 Winter Olympics
Military patrol competitors at the 1936 Winter Olympics
FIS Nordic World Ski Championships medalists in cross-country skiing
German military personnel killed in World War II
20th-century German people